The Gem Saloon, at 808 Main St. in Thompson Falls, Montana, USA, was built in 1914. It is a historic building listed on the U.S. National Register of Historic Places. It has also been used by, and was known as, Napa Auto Parts, and has been a restaurant, too. When photographed in 2013 it held a pizza shop.

It was listed on the National Register of Historic Places in 1986.

It was one of five commercial buildings in Thompson Falls that were together listed on the NRHP, as part of a multiple property submission.

References 

Commercial buildings on the National Register of Historic Places in Montana
Commercial buildings completed in 1914
Drinking establishments on the National Register of Historic Places in Montana
National Register of Historic Places in Sanders County, Montana
1914 establishments in Montana
Thompson Falls, Montana